Nevus oligemicus presents as a patch of livid skin that is cooler than the normal skin, as a result of decreased blood flow, in which vasoconstriction of deep vessels is thought to be the underlying defect.

See also 
 List of cutaneous conditions

References 

Dermal and subcutaneous growths